Amazon was launched in France in 1775 under another name and taken in prize in 1780. British owners named her Amazon and she became a West Indiaman. In 1782 an American letter-of-marque, a former British Royal Navy frigate, captured her, but the Royal Navy quickly recaptured her. She then became Dumfries. She may have been renamed again. She reappeared as Amazon in 1790, and traded between London and Smyrna. In 1798 she made one voyage for the British East India Company (EIC) between 1797 and 1798. She then made three voyages as a slave ship between 1800 and 1804. Her subsequent history is currently obscure.

Career
Amazon appears in Lloyd's Register in 1781 with W. Gray, master, Robinson & Co., owners, and trade London–Jamaica. Then on 16 August 1782, Lloyd's List reported that the transport Amazon, Gray, master, had been taken  while carrying clothing to Quebec. Her captor was the American letter of marque Flora, formerly HMS Flora, which sent her capture to Bordeaux. However, shortly thereafter  recaptured Amazon and sent her into Newfoundland. In 1793 Portlands officers and crew received prize money for the recapture of Amazon and her cargo.

Dumfries
In 1783 Amazon was renamed Dumfries, with Nicholson, master, and trade London transport. She had damages repaired in 1783, and in 1784 her master was J. Tullock. Her owner was still Robinson, but her trade was now London–West Indies. She may then have been resold or renamed because both Amazon and Dumfries disappear from Lloyd's Register for some years.

Amazon again
Amazon reappears in Lloyd's Register in 1790 with Waring, master, Chapman, owner, and trade London−Smyrna. She had undergone "good repairs" in 1785 and 1790. In 1792 she received a "thorough repair" and her master became R. Stanning. On 19 April 1791 Lloyd's List reported that Amazon, Waring, master, had returned from Smyrna.

Lloyd's Register for 1795 (published in 1794), showed Waring again as master, though her trade remained London–Smyrna.
Captain William Waring acquired a letter of marque on 19 September 1794.

EIC voyage
Waring sailed from Falmouth on 16 February 1797, bound for China. Amazon arrived at Whampoa Anchorage on 11 July. Homeward bound, she was at Lintin on 1 January 1798 and Malacca on 16 January. She reached the Cape of Good Hope on 18 March and St Helena on 14 April. She was at Cork on 25 June and arrived at Long Reach on 11 July. At some point Charles Hooper replaced Waring as master, but when and why is currently not clear.

Lloyd's List for 1799 showed Amazons master changing from Waring to M'Dowell, and her ownership from Chapman to Cullen.

Slave ship
Amazon became a slave ship and made three voyages transporting slaves from West Africa to the Caribbean.

First slave voyage (1799–1800): Captain William Grahame acquired a letter of marque on 25 February 1799. He sailed from Liverpool on 10 March 1799, bound for the Bight of Biafra and the Gulf of Guinea Islands. He gathered his slaves at Calabar and delivered them to Kingston, Jamaica, on 16 January 1800. He had embarked 426 slaves and disembarked 390, for a loss rate of 8.5%. Amazon left Jamaica on 31 May 1800. Amazon left the Jamaica fleet on 10 June, and arrived back at Liverpool on 16 July 1800. She had had a crew of 62 and suffered 23 crew deaths on the voyage.

Second slave voyage (1800–1802): captain James Cosnahan acquired a letter of marque on 6 December 1800.  He sailed from Liverpool on 30 December 1800, bound for the Bight of Biafra and the Gulf of Guinea Islands. He gathered his slaves at Bonny and Calabar and delivered them to Kingston, Jamaica, on 16 August 1801. He had embarked 358 slaves and disembarked 323, for a loss rate of 9.8%. Amazon sailed for England on 25 March 1802. She had to put back leaky, but still arrived at Liverpool on 19 May. She had 15 deaths among her crew of 43.

Third slave voyage (1802–1803): Captain John Hunter sailed from Liverpool on 22 October 1802 for Africa and arrived at Havana in July 1803 with 396 slaves.

Fate
There is no further data on Amazon. A brig Amazon, Wales, master, was taken on 10 October 1803 off Cape Antonio as she was sailing from Jamaica to Halifax, but it is not currently possible to determine definitively whether she was or was not the slaver Amazon.

Data from the registers
 
The following table presents data from Lloyd's Register:

The following table presents data from the Register of Shipping:

Notes, citations, and references
Notes

Citations

References

1775 ships
Ships built in France
Captured ships
Age of Sail merchant ships of England
Ships of the British East India Company
Liverpool slave ships